The 2014–15 Texas A&M–Corpus Christi Islanders men's basketball team represented Texas A&M University–Corpus Christi in the 2014–15 NCAA Division I men's basketball season. This was head coach Willis Wilson's fourth season at Texas A&M–Corpus Christi. The Islanders are members of the Southland Conference and played their home games at the American Bank Center and the Dugan Wellness Center.

The Islanders were picked to finish fourth (4th) in the Southland Conference Coaches' Poll and tied for third (3rd) in the Sports Information Director Poll.  They received one first place vote in the SID poll.

They finished the season 20–14, 13–5 in Southland play to finish in a tie for third place. They advanced to the semifinals of the Southland tournament where they lost to Sam Houston State. They were invited to the CollegeInsider.com Tournament where they defeated Florida Gulf Coast in the first round before losing in the second round to Kent State.

Media
Texas A&M–Corpus Christi men's basketball airs on KKTX with Steven King on the call all season long. Video streaming of all non-televised home games is available at GoIslanders.com.

Roster

Schedule and results

|-
!colspan=9 style="background:#0067C5; color:#9EA2A4;"| Out of Conference

|-
!colspan=9 style="background:#0067C5; color:#9EA2A4;"| Conference Games

|-
!colspan=9 style="background:#0067C5; color:#9EA2A4;"| Southland tournament

|-
!colspan=9 style="background:#0067C5; color:#9EA2A4;"| CIT

See also
2014–15 Texas A&M–Corpus Christi Islanders women's basketball team

References

Texas A&M–Corpus Christi Islanders men's basketball seasons
Texas AandM-Corpus Christi
Texas AandM-Corpus Christi Islanders basketball
Texas AandM-Corpus Christi Islanders basketball
Texas AandM-Corpus Christi